Qelich Qeshlaqi (also Romanized as Qelīch Qeshlāqī; also known as Qelenj Qeshlāq, Qelench Qeshlāq, and Qelīch Qeshlāq) is a village in Gerdeh Rural District, in the Central District of Namin County, Ardabil Province, Iran. At the 2006 census, its population was 69, in 13 families.

Geo-coordinates

Latitude = 38.2875, Longitude = 48.3810 
Lat    = 38 degrees,   17.3 minutes   North
Long = 48 degrees,   22.9 minutes   East

References 

Towns and villages in Namin County